Dobbertin is a municipality in the Ludwigslust-Parchim district, in Mecklenburg-Vorpommern, Germany. An important sight is Dobbertin Abbey. The municipality is situated in a landscape with many lakes and woods. It stands on the largest lake in the area, the  Dobbertiner See.

Notable people
Christa Merten (1944–1986), athlete
Rainer Podlesch (born 1944), retired cyclist

References

Ludwigslust-Parchim